Bear Brook is an American true crime podcast covering the Bear Brook murders. The podcast is hosted by Jason Moon and was released through New Hampshire Public Radio. Moon began covering the cold case in 2015, and later started the podcast. The case was eventually solved by two women at almost the same time, and the results are covered throughout the podcast episodes. The podcast is significant because it explains the genealogy and genetic techniques that were used to solve the Bear Brook, marking the first time these techniques were used to solve a cold case. The genealogy technique was later used to solve the murders of the Golden State Killer. Furthermore, the podcast drew international attention to New Hampshire Public Radio. By November 2018, the podcast had been downloaded more than 1.1 million times. After a break in the case, popularity increased, and by March 2020, the podcast had been downloaded more than 12 million times.

Background
In 1985, two bodies were found in a blue barrel in the woods of Allenstown, New Hampshire, in Bear Brook State Park. In 2005, a second barrel was found containing two more bodies. It was determined that the bodies were that of a woman and three young girls. In 2015, Jason Moon began reporting on the murders after it was announced that authorities were using new forensic techniques in order to try to identify the bodies. Moon wrote a six and a half minute script for a news report on the murders, which later expanded into episodes one through three of the podcast at the suggestion of digital director Rebecca Lavoie.

In 2017, Moon and the editorial team for New Hampshire Public Radio began turning his reporting work into the podcast. In June 2018, Moon began working full-time on Bear Brook. The podcast quickly became one of New Hampshire Public Radio's biggest projects. The podcast was unable to secure paid advertisers to support the podcast, so as podcast episodes were released, listeners who made donations to the radio station were given early access to upcoming episodes. The station received more than $38,000 in donations.

Eventually, the murderer was revealed to be Terry Peder Rasmussen. Rebekah Heath, a librarian and researcher who helped to solve the murders first heard about the murders on the podcast. The initial breakthrough in the case took 10,000 hours of work.

In May 2019, Moon and Quimby went on an East Coast tour, visiting Washington, D.C., Baltimore, New Jersey; Brooklyn, and Boston.

On March 20, 2020, 20/20 on ABC News hosted a two hour special on the podcast which featured host Jason Moon. The program was a cooperative project with New Hampshire Public Radio.

Production
The podcast was hosted by Jason Moon and produced by Taylor Quimby. Most of the original music in the podcast was written, composed, and performed by Moon and Quimby.

See also
List of American crime podcasts

References

External links

Audio podcasts
Crime podcasts
Investigative journalism
Infotainment
2018 podcast debuts
2019 podcast endings
American podcasts
Allenstown, New Hampshire
1985 in New Hampshire
2005 in New Hampshire
2015 in New Hampshire